Darshan Buttar (born in Nabha, Punjab, India) is an Indian poet  known for his  short poems in Punjabi. His work is a part of the syllabus at the Punjabi University, Patiala.

Books
 Maha Kambani (The Ultimate Trembling)
 Salaabi Hawa (Damp Wind)
 Shabad Shehar te Ret (Word, City and Dust)
 Aud de Baddal (The Dry Clouds).
 Khaṛāwāṃ

Awards
He won the Sahitya Akademi Award in 2012 for his book Maha Kambani (The Ultimate Trembling).

References 

Poets from Punjab, India
Punjabi-language writers
Recipients of the Sahitya Akademi Award in Punjabi
People from Patiala district